Cyril Francis Walter Allcott (7 October 1896 – 19 November 1973) was a New Zealand Test cricketer who played in six Test matches for the New Zealand national cricket team between 1930 and 1932.

Early life
Allcott was born at Lower Moutere in 1896. He attended Marlborough High School on a scholarship and found work as a clerk in the National Bank of New Zealand when he left school. Allcott played club cricket for Marlborough Allcott enlisted in the New Zealand Army in October 1917, towards the end of World War I. He embarked for Europe on the SS Ulimaroa, arriving at London in October, before the Armistice although he did not see action at the front. He was discharged from the army in September 1919.

Cricket career
Following the war, Allcott played club cricket in the Napier area before making his first-class cricket debut for Hawke's Bay in February 1921 in a match against a touring Australian side. He went on to play the majority of his domestic first-class cricket for Auckland between 1921/22 and 1931/32. He played as an allrounder who bowled slow left-arm orthodox deliveries and batted left-handed.

Much of Allcott's cricket was played in the years immediately before New Zealand gained Test match status. He toured Australia in 1925/26 and England in 1927 with New Zealand representative sides before playing in New Zealand's third and fourth Test matches in 1930 against the touring England side. He toured England with New Zealand in 1931, playing in all three Test matches on the tour as well as being responsible for managing the teams finances during the tour, before making his final Test appearance in the last Test of the home series against South Africa in 1932. He scored a total of 113 runs and took six wickets in his six Test matches, with his Wisden obituary noting that although he was a "good allrounder" who had a number of "notable performances" in first-class matches to his name, he had "achieved little in Test cricket"―although in 1932 the almanack had described his batting partnership with Tom Lowry in the first Test against England, which New Zealand drew, as "determined".

Allcott's final Test appearance was the last of his first-class career until he played a single match for Otago against Auckland in the 1945/46 Plunket Shield, having played a domestic non first-class match for the side during World War II and club cricket in Dunedin for Kaikorai during World War II―the Evening Star newspaper reporting that despite his age he was still bowling unchanged in club cricket for "close on three hours", his left-arm inswing deliveries still "pretty difficult to play". In his final first-class match he bowled 38 eight-ball overs and took three wickets, despite fracturing a toe whilst batting.

Later life
Allcott retired from club cricket in 1947 at over 50 years of age. He also played golf and entered the Auckland Open for the first time in 1957. He died at Auckland in 1973. He was aged 77.

Notes

References

External links
 

1896 births
1973 deaths
Auckland cricketers
New Zealand Test cricketers
Pre-1930 New Zealand representative cricketers
New Zealand cricketers
Otago cricketers
People from the Tasman District
Hawke's Bay cricketers
North Island cricketers
People educated at Marlborough Boys' College